Bao Zhenhua (born 8 June 1965) is a Chinese figure skater. She competed at the 1980 Winter Olympics and the 1984 Winter Olympics. She became a figure skating coach after studying at University of Teacher Education Fukuoka in the 1990s, and spent her coach career in Fuzhou and Shenzhen in the 2010s.

References

External links
 

1965 births
Living people
Chinese female single skaters
Olympic figure skaters of China
Figure skaters at the 1980 Winter Olympics
Figure skaters at the 1984 Winter Olympics
Figure skaters from Jilin
Chinese figure skating coaches